Ohtakari is an island and community in the Finnish sector of the Bay of Bothnia.

Description

Ohtakari is an island and fishing village of the Kokkola district in the former municipality of Lohtaja. 
Ohtakari is at the head of the Lohtaja Vattaja peninsula, connected by a causeway, the last island before the open sea. 
Ohtakari holds a fishing port, a fishing museum, a Lutheran Evangelical Association of Finland (Suomen Luterilainen Evankeliumiyhdistys ry, SLEY) camp and an old turf maze, or Troy Town.  There is also a look-out tower and functioning lighthouse.
An annual festival is held in the village.

History

The oldest taxation records of Ohtakari date to the 1500s.
Fishermen lived on the island during the best fishing period. 
The island also served as a pilot's station for more than a hundred years. 
The work of the fishermen in the old days is presented in the fishing museum. 
The causeway leading to the island was completed in the 1970s.

Distances

Lohtaja village - about 
Kokkola - about 
Himanka - about

Gallery

References

Sources

 Lohtajan kunta - Ohtakari
 SLEY:n Ohtakarin Leirikeskus

Finnish islands in the Baltic
Landforms of North Ostrobothnia